The Women's 100 metre backstroke S7 swimming event at the 2004 Summer Paralympics was competed on 22 September. It was won by Kristin Hakonardottir, representing .

1st round

Heat 1
22 Sept. 2004, morning session

Heat 2
22 Sept. 2004, morning session

Final round

22 Sept. 2004, evening session

References

W
2004 in women's swimming